The Abu Dhabi Cultural Foundation was founded in 1981 as a center of art and learning.  It is located in the middle of downtown Abu Dhabi, UAE, off Khalifa Street and next to the White Fort, also known as Qasr al-Hosn Palace.  The center hosts a variety of events, including art exhibits, lectures, concerts and movies, and arts workshop classes.  The foundation is operated under the Abu Dhabi Authority for Culture and Heritage.

References

Organizations established in 1981
Organisations based in Abu Dhabi
Cultural Foundation
Cultural Foundation
Arts centres in the United Arab Emirates
1981 establishments in the United Arab Emirates
Cultural organisations based in the United Arab Emirates